Ajanjul (Ajanjǔl)  was a Palestinian Arab village in the Ramle Subdistrict of Mandatory Palestine. It was depopulated during the 1947–48 Civil War in Mandatory Palestine.

History
The Abu Ghosh family took up residence in Ajanjul in the 18th century. The village is described as "an offshoot village of Bayt Nuba, from where they (the Abu Ghosh) controlled the Valley of Ayalon, including the important village of Bayt Liqya". 

In 1838, it was noted as a place "in ruins or deserted."

In 1883, the PEF's Survey of Western Palestine found  at  Kh. Junjul:   "traces of ruins".

British Mandate era
According to a census conducted in 1931 by the British Mandate authorities, Ajanjul had a population of 19, in 5 houses.

In the 1945 statistics the population of Beit Nuba and  Ajanjul was 1,240, all Muslims,  while the total land area was 11,401  dunams, according to an official land and population survey. Of this,  1,002 dunams  were allocated for plantations and irrigable land, 6,997 for cereals, while 74 dunams were classified as built-up areas.

There is no record of what happened to the villagers in 1948.

1948, aftermath
In 1992 the village site was described: ”The stone debris of  houses, concentrated in a small spot and overgrown with wild vegetation, are all that remains of the village. Fig, almond, and mulberry trees also grow on and around the site. On the southern  side of the village there is a rocky structure containing two graves; southwest of it lies the village cemetery,  where two stone graves are visible. The area is closed and is located along the 1967 border between Jordan and Israel."

References

Bibliography

External links
Welcome To Ajanjul
Ajanjul, Zochrot 
Survey of Western Palestine, Map 17:  IAA, Wikimedia commons 

Arab villages depopulated during the 1948 Arab–Israeli War
District of Ramla